Mandragora (1991) by David McRobbie is a contemporary novel which deals with the sinking of a sailing ship. Dunarling. Adam Hardy and Catriona Chisholm accidentally find a cache of five small dolls made from mandrake roots. The dolls were left in a hole a hundred years earlier by two other teenagers, Jamie and Margaret, who had survived the wreck of the Dunarling.

Transcribing a diary from that same fatal voyage, Adam and Catriona learn of the cursed mandrake roots, whose power destroyed the Dunarling in 1886. It seems the curses are working again in the town of Dunarling today.

Plot summary
A sailing ship, the Dunarling carries 85 passengers emigrating from Scotland to South Australia. On the ship are four mandrake dolls, put aboard by a mysterious woman. There is also another doll which belonged to the ship's captain.

100 years after the shipwreck, two teenagers, Adam Hardy and Catriona Chisholm, discover the five dolls in a cave. Two other boys, Richard Vernon and Mike Carter aggressively take four of the dolls, but Adam manages to keep one of them.

With the single doll in his possession, Adam starts having visions of past events on the ship, then unsettling incidents begin to happen in the town, starting with a fire. Following a study of the old diary, Adam begins to see uncanny parallels between what happened on the ship and the dangerous events that are taking place in town. There follows a series of frightening encounters as Adam, with Catriona's help, begins to face the threat that seems to have beset the town. At times Adam is accused of orchestrating these events himself.

In a shattering conclusion, Adam alone has to face the might and fury of the four dolls who unleash their power. The story ends with revelations concerning Catriona's family links to Margaret.

The book has an end piece with historical details of the real mandrake dolls together with a discussion of shipwrecks of the late 19th century.

1991 Australian novels
Australian fantasy novels
Contemporary fantasy novels